Rural poverty refers to poverty in rural areas, including factors of rural society, rural economy, and political systems that give rise to the poverty found there. Rural areas, because of their spread-out populations, typically have less well maintained infrastructure and a harder time accessing markets, which tend to be concentrated in population centers. 

Rural communities also face disadvantages in terms of legal and social protections, with women and marginalized communities frequently having hard times accessing land, education and other support systems that help with economic development. Several policies have been tested in both developing and developed economies, including rural electrification and access to other technologies such as internet, gender parity, and improved access to credit and income.

In academic studies, rural poverty is often discussed in conjunction with spatial inequality, which in this context refers to the inequality between urban and rural areas. Both rural poverty and spatial inequality are global phenomena, but like poverty in general, there are higher rates of rural poverty in developing countries than in developed countries.

Eradicating rural poverty through effective policies and economic growth is a continuing difficulty for the international community. According to the Food and Agriculture Organization, three quarters of those in poverty are in rural areas, most of whom are smallholders or agricultural workers whose livelihoods are heavily dependent on agriculture. These food systems are vulnerable to extreme weather, which is expected to effect agricultural systems the world over more as climate change increases. 

Thus the climate crises is expected to reduce the effectiveness of programs reducing rural poverty and cause displacement of rural communities to urban centers. Sustainable Development Goal 1: No Poverty sets international goals to address these issues, and are deeply connected with investments in a sustainable food system as part of Sustainable Development Goal 2: Zero Hunger.

Prevalence
The first target of the Millennium Development Goals was to decrease the extent of extreme poverty by one-half by the year 2015, which could not be achieved. Poverty remains a predominantly rural problem, with a majority of the world's poor located in rural areas. It is estimated that 76 percent of the developing world's poor live in rural areas, well above the overall population share living in rural areas, which is only 58 percent. Disparities between rural and urban areas is on the rise, particularly in many developing and transitional countries. Globally, rural people and rural places tend to be disadvantaged relative to their urban counterparts   and poverty rates increase as rural areas become more remote. Individuals living in rural areas tend to have less access to social services, exacerbating the effects of rural poverty.

Contributing factors

Lack of infrastructure
Rural poverty is often a product of poor infrastructure that hinders development and mobility. Rural areas tend to lack sufficient roads that would increase access to agricultural inputs and markets. Without roads, the rural poor are cut off from technological development and emerging markets in more urban areas. Poor infrastructure hinders communication, resulting in social isolation among the rural poor, many of whom have limited access to media and news outlets. Such isolation hinders integration with urban society and established markets, which could result in greater development and economic security. Moreover, poor or nonexistent irrigation systems threaten agricultural yields because of uncertainty in the supply of water for crop production. Many poor rural areas lack any irrigation to store or pump water, resulting in fewer crops, fewer days of employment and less productivity. Both a lack of roads and insufficient irrigation systems result in greater Work Intensity in many rural communities.

Researchers at the ODI conducted a literature review to assess the relationship between all types of roads and both their security impacts and the effects of road building on access to for example health and education (service delivery) particularly in fragile, sparsely populated and/or ill-served rural areas in developing countries.
	
They found no direct evidence relating to the security impact of road infrastructure, and that only theoretical linkages of infrastructure development are discussed in studies. There are various direct and indirect channels through which transport infrastructure may affect security and peace building. They agree that infrastructure programmes can potentially play three roles in a fragile context: as an engine of economic recovery and improved service provision, as part of a process of strengthening institutions, and in stabilisation and peace-building.

They claim the state of evidence regarding these causal links is weak but some aspects of infrastructure development, including but not exclusive to road construction, has been shown to be effective in fragile country contexts. Quick Impact has not yet proven to be effective in enhancing peace building and security in Fragile and Conflict Affected States.

Their literature search presented some evidence of road development resulting in employment sometimes for the most vulnerable and/or poor groups. They found  case studies show road development programmes can produce short-term employment opportunities in fragile and conflict affected regions particularly applying to programmes where rural road development is carried out through community-driven development or with special emphasis on inclusion through participatory methods. Evidence is mostly limited to number of hours of employment generated or individuals employed and include little rigorous impact evaluation.

There was also some evidence that rural road construction reduced isolation for minority groups and provided more opportunities for inclusion in wider economic activity. However, this evidence did not relate directly to reducing conflict or improving security. Poverty and isolation literature defines this as access to inputs and output markets, access to education and health services, and access to labour opportunities through which road access contributes to reduced poverty.

Mostly qualitative evidence found suggests that rural road construction or maintenance has a positive impact on public service delivery. In general rural road development leads to improved access of both users and suppliers. This occurs due to a reduction in commuting time, as well transport costs but these benefits tend to accrue disproportionately to the influential and well-educated. Rural communities tend to ascribe great importance to road development and perceive it to improve access to markets, health and education facilities.

Geographic barriers

Moreover, poverty is often a result of geographic barriers, certain places are located in such  rigid geographic areas that development is not possible there and not only that the people living there lack access to their basic requirements, often the government in economically weaker countries takes no interest in the development of these areas and thus the people living here have to suffer from the ill effects of poverty. Major geographic barriers like remote and/or small islands and archipelagoes in a large ocean, low population, very rugged and/or especially high elevation mountainous terrain such as the Himalayas and Andes present formidable barriers to development even beyond the typical rural poverty situation !

Insufficient access to markets
A lack of access to markets - whether due to poor infrastructure or productivity, limited education, or insufficient information - prevents access to both labor and capital. In many rural societies, there are few job opportunities outside of agriculture, often resulting in food and income insecurity due to the precarious nature of farming. Rural workers are largely concentrated in jobs such as owners-cultivators, tenant farmers, sharecroppers, informal care workers, agricultural day-laborers, and livestock herders. Without access to other labor markets, rural workers continue to work for extremely low wages in agricultural jobs that tend to have seasonal fluctuations and thus little income security. In addition to labor, the rural poor often lack access to capital markets and financial institutions, hindering their ability to establish savings and obtain credit that could be used to purchase working capital or increase their supply of raw materials. When coupled with scarce job opportunities, poor access to credit and capital perpetuates rural poverty.

Lack of non-motorised load-carrying wheeled vehicles (handcarts and wheelbarrows)
Numerous international development organisations have studied, reported, recommended and agreed that lack of mobility impedes human progress and development. Yet there is very little evidence of anyone attempting to actually address and alleviate the problem by introducing handcarts and wheelbarrows into remote and rural areas where they would be most beneficial.

Rural versus urban poverty--United States
In the United States, where rural poverty rates are higher and more persistent than in urban areas, rural workers are disadvantaged by lower wages and less access to better paying labor markets. As a result, underemployment and informal work are more prevalent in rural areas, and where formal employment is found, it acts as less of a buffer against poverty. As a result, rural poverty in the U.S. is more persistent than urban poverty – 95 percent of persistent poverty counties in the U.S. are rural, while only 2 percent of persistent poverty counties are urban.

Opening up of economies to international trade
Some macro-level economic changes have been associated with an increase in spatial inequalities. There have been numerous studies showing a link between more open trade, accompanied by other neoliberal policies, and higher incidences of rural poverty and spatial inequalities In China, for example, greater trade openness provides at least partial explanation for more pronounced rural-urban disparities, and in Vietnam, trade liberalization has resulted in higher poverty rates in rural areas. Both of these nations demonstrate that despite greater openness and growth, spatial inequalities do not necessarily decrease accordingly with overall economic growth. Moreover, the promotion of export-oriented agriculture has been linked to decreased food security for rural populations.

Education and social service inadequacies
In many rural societies, a lack of access to education and limited opportunities to increase and improve one's skillset inhibit social mobility. Low levels of education and few skills result in much of the rural poor working as subsistence farmers or in insecure, informal employment, perpetuating the state of rural poverty. Inadequate education regarding health and nutritional needs often results in under-nutrition or malnutrition among the rural poor. Social isolation due to inadequate roads and poor access to information makes acquiring health care (and affording it) particularly difficult for the rural poor, resulting in worse health and higher rates of infant mortality. There have been noted disparities in both Asia and Africa between rural and urban areas in terms of the allocation of public education and health services.

Case study: Africa

A study of 24 African countries found that “standards of living in rural areas almost universally lag behind urban areas.”  In terms of education, school enrollments and the ratio of girl-to-boy enrollments is much lower in rural areas than in urban areas. A similar trend is found in access to neonatal care, as those living in rural areas had far less access to care than their urban counterparts. There are also far more malnourished children in rural areas of Africa than in urban areas. In Zimbabwe, for example, more than twice the share of children are malnourished in rural areas (34 percent rate of malnourishment) than in urban areas (15 percent rate of malnourishment). Inequality between urban and rural areas, and where rural poverty is most prevalent, is in countries where the adult population has the lowest amount of education. This was found in the Sahelian countries of Burkina Faso, Mali and Niger where regional inequality is 33 percent, 19.4 percent, and 21.3 percent, respectively.  In each of these countries, more than 74 percent of the adults have no education. Overall, in much of Africa, those living in rural areas experience more poverty and less access to health care and education.

Women and rural poverty

Rural women are particularly disadvantaged, both as poor and as women. Women in both rural and urban areas face a higher risk of poverty and more limited economic opportunities than their male counterparts. The number of rural women living in extreme poverty rose by about 50 percent over the past twenty years. Women in rural poverty live under the same harsh conditions as their male counterparts, but experience additional cultural and policy biases which undervalue their work in both the informal, and if accessible, formal labor markets. The 2009 World Survey states that “women play an active role in agriculture and rural livelihoods as unpaid family labour, independent farmers and wage labour, often without access to land, credit and other productive assets.”  Women's contribution to the rural economy is generally underestimated, as women perform a disproportionate amount of care work, work that often goes unrecognized because it is not seen as economically productive. Though in some nations, cultural and societal norms prevent women from working outside the home, in other countries, especially in rural communities in Africa, women work as major food producers, improving household food and income security. Families in extreme poverty are even more dependent on women's work both inside and outside the home, resulting in longer days and more intense work for women  The feminization of poverty is a concept that is applicable in both urban and rural settings.

Policies to combat rural poverty

Land reform
Access to land can alleviate rural poverty by providing households a productive and relatively reliable way to make an income. The rural poor often have less access to land, which contributes to their poverty. The rural poor's access to land can be improved by redistributing land from large farms above a certain size, government legislation that challenges some traditional land systems that keep land concentrated in the hands of a few, and settlement schemes which involves providing poor rural families parcels of newly developed or government owned land. Achieving legislative reform and implementing redistributive policies, however, is a difficult task in many countries because land ownership is a sensitive cultural and political issue. Yet in China, for example, land redistribution policies have found some success and are associated with a reduction in rural poverty and increased agricultural growth.

Women and land reform
The development of legal measures to improve women's access to land is linked with achieving greater gender parity. This requires women to have the legal right to own land, as well as designating women as individual or joint owners of land parcels redistributed during reform. It also involves allowing women to have separate tenancy rights and granting women the right to claim an equal share of family land and resources upon divorce, abandonment, widowhood, and for inheritance purposes. A lack of access to land and property is linked to poverty, migration, violence, and HIV/AIDS. Increasing a woman's access to land not only benefits herself, but also benefits her family and community both in terms of increased productivity and improved welfare for her children. Beyond just legislative reform, for laws to actually guarantee women the right to land and equal inheritance, they need to be enforced; in numerous countries, despite women achieving equal land rights, long-standing social and cultural norms continue to bias policy implementation.

Case study: Bangladesh
Improved infrastructure in Bangladesh increased agricultural production by 32 percent through its effect on prices and access to inputs and technology. Improving roads and transportation systems also resulted in a 33 percent increase in the household income of the poor through the ability to diversify production, as well as an increase in savings and investment and better access to financial credit. Moreover, because of increased mobility among rural households, a rise in access to social services was noted, as well as an increase in overall health.

Technology
The development of appropriate technology can raise a farm's productivity. Successful technological developments that aid the rural poor are achieved through bottom-up policies that involve technological innovations that require few external inputs and little monetary investment. The most effective innovations are based on the active participation of small farmers, who are involved in both defining the problems and implementing and evaluating solutions. Smallholder technological developments have focused on processes such as nutrient recycling, integrated pest management, integration of crop agriculture and livestock, use of inland and marine water sources, soil conservation, and use of genetic engineering and biotechnology to reduce fertilizer requirements.

Electrification

Access to credit
Providing access to credit and financial services provides an entry point to improve rural productivity as well as stimulating small-scale trading and manufacturing. With credit, rural farmers are able to purchase capital that increases their productivity and income. Increased credit helps expand markets to rural areas, thus promoting rural development. The ability to acquire credit also combats systems of bonded or exploitative labor by encouraging self-employment. Credit policy is most effective when provided in conjunction with other services such as technology and marketing training.

Diversification
Agricultural diversification can provide rural families with higher income and greater food security. Diversification, or a reallocation of some of a farm's productive resources, reduces farming risk, especially risk related to unpredictable or extreme weather that may be due to climate change. Policies related to diversification have also focused on crop rotation to increase productivity, as well as improving the production of traditional food crops such as cassava, cowpeas, plantains, and bananas rather than promoting the growth of more precarious cash crops. These crops tend to be at the core of farming systems among the rural poor and are generally more drought resistant and can survive under poor soil conditions. Improving the productivity and marketing of these crops promotes food and income security among rural households.

Universal Basic Income
Universal basic income, or UBI, has been suggested as a way to relieve rural poverty. Some studies have supported Unconditional Cash Transfers, or UCT, a type of UBI, as a way to alleviate the negative externalities associated with poverty such as food insecurity. Particularly, one study conducted in Kenya from 2011 to 2013, which studied the effects of UCT on a subset of 1500 households in Nyanza Province, found that UCT is an effective method concluding "Results demonstrated that the program had significant welfare-improving impacts, both economically and psychologically, for transfer recipients."

See also
 Capability approach
 Economic inequality
 Empowerment
 Feminization of poverty
 Food security
 Gender equality
 Human rights
 Millennium Development Goals
 Poverty
 Subsistence agriculture
 Rural development
 Water scarcity in Africa
 Work Intensity

References

Further reading
 
 
  Prepared for the Rural Secretariat, Agriculture and Agri-Food Canada, Government of Canada.
 
 
 
 
 

Poverty
Rural culture